George Walter Mapp (May 23, 1873 – February 2, 1941) was an American lawyer and Democratic politician who served as a member of the Virginia Senate, where he was a strong proponent of prohibition and women's suffrage.

References

External links

1873 births
1941 deaths
Democratic Party Virginia state senators
20th-century American politicians
People from Accomack County, Virginia